The 1996 season of the Ukrainian Championship was the 5th season of Ukraine's women's football competitions. The championship ran from 26 April 1996 to 14 October 1996.

Before the start many clubs withdrew from the league again.

Teams

Team changes

Name changes
 none

Higher League

League table

References

External links
WFPL.ua
Women's Football.ua

1996
1995–96 in Ukrainian association football leagues
1996–97 in Ukrainian association football leagues
Ukrainian Women's League
Ukrainian Women's League